Burdenski is a surname. Notable people with the surname include:

Dieter Burdenski (born 1950), German footballer, father of Fabian and son of Herbert
Fabian Burdenski (born 1991), German footballer
Herbert Burdenski (1922–2001), German footballer and manager